
Year 736 (DCCXXXVI) was a leap year starting on Sunday (link will display the full calendar) of the Julian calendar. The denomination 736 for this year has been used since the early medieval period, when the Anno Domini calendar era became the prevalent method in Europe for naming years.

Events 
<onlyinclude>

By place

Europe 
 Charles Martel, Merovingian mayor of the palace, forms local alliances with the Burgundians, and imposes Frankish domination on Provence. He defeats Muslim forces at Sernhac and Beaucaire in Septimania (Southern France). 
 Battle of Nîmes: The Franks under Charles Martel fail to capture Narbonne but devastate most of the other settlements, including Nîmes, Agde, Béziers and Maguelonne, which Martel views as potential strongholds of the Umayyads.

Britain 
 King Æthelbald of Mercia is described in the Ismere Diploma as ruler (bretwalda) of the Mercians, and all the provinces in southern England. He is also named "Rex Britanniae" (king of Britain). 
 King Óengus I of the Picts invades the neighbouring kingdom of Dál Riata, which is subjugated. He takes the fortress of Dunadd, and establishes his rule in Scotland for over two decades.

Asia 
 Rōben, scholar-Buddhist monk, invites Shinshō to give lectures on the Avatamsaka Sutra at Kinshōsen-ji (later Tōdai-ji); this event is considered to be the roots of the Kegon school of Buddhism founded in Japan.

Central America 
June 15 – Uaxaclajuun Ub'aah K'awiil ("Eighteen Rabbit"), ruler of the Mayan city state of Copán in Honduras is defeated in battle by Kʼakʼ Tiliw Chan Yopaat, the ruler of Quiriguá (in Guatemala), and is beheaded. K'ak' ("Smoke Monkey") rules until his death in 749.
 A diplomatic team from Calakmul, led by Wamaw K'awiil, meets with Quiriguá leader K’ak Tiliw Chan Yopaa, in an attempt to negotiate an end to the city's rebellion during the Third Tikal-Calakmul War.
 The Mayan city state of Tikal defeats Calakmul in what is now Guatemala, ending a centuries-long rivalry, but ushering in another century of warfare that ultimately leads to both cities' abandonment in the 9th century.
 Yik'in Chan K'awiil, ruler (ajaw) of the leading Maya city state of Tikal (modern-day Guatemala), conquers rival Calakmul, within the northern Petén region of the Yucatán region (Southern Mexico).

Births 
 Hun Jian, Chinese general
 Zhao Jing, Chinese official

Deaths 
 Hugbert, duke of Bavaria
 Muiredach mac Ainbcellaig, king of Dál Riata
 Yamabe no Akahito, Japanese poet

References